The Silent Avenger is a 1927 American silent action film directed by James P. Hogan and starring Charles Delaney, Duane Thompson and George Chesebro.

Cast
 Thunder the Dog as Thunder
 Charles Delaney as Stanley Gilmore 
 Duane Thompson as Patsy Wade 
 George Chesebro as Bill Garton
 David Kirby as Joe Sneed 
 Robert Homans as Steven Gilmore 
 Clarence Wilson as Dave Wade 
 Buck Black as Bud Wade

References

Bibliography
 Munden, Kenneth White. The American Film Institute Catalog of Motion Pictures Produced in the United States, Part 1. University of California Press, 1997.

External links
 

1927 films
1920s action films
1920s English-language films
American silent feature films
American action films
Films directed by James Patrick Hogan
American black-and-white films
Gotham Pictures films
1920s American films
Silent action films